The Pontiac GTO is a front-engine, rear-drive, two-door, four or five passenger automobile  manufactured and marketed by the Pontiac division of General Motors over four generations from 1963-1974 in the United States — with a fifth generation by GM's Australian subsidiary, Holden, for 2004-2006 model years.

The first generation of the GTO is credited as popularizing the muscle car market segment in the 1960s. The Pontiac GTO is considered by some to have started the trend with all four domestic automakers offering a variety of competing models.

For the 1964 and 1965 model years, the GTO was an optional package on the intermediate-sized Pontiac Lemans. The 1964 GTO vehicle identification number (VIN) started with 22, while the 1965 GTO VIN started with 237. The GTO became a separate model from 1966 to 1971 (VIN 242...). It became an optional package again for the 1972 and 1973 intermediate LeMans. For 1974, the GTO was an optional trim package on the compact-sized Ventura.

The GTO was selected as the Motor Trend Car of the Year in 1968.

The GTO model was revived from 2004 to 2006 model years as a captive import for Pontiac, a left-hand drive version of the Holden Monaro, itself a coupé variant of the Holden Commodore.

Origins
In early 1963, General Motors' management banned divisions from involvement in auto racing. This followed the 1957 voluntary ban on automobile racing that was instituted by the Automobile Manufacturers Association. By the early 1960s, Pontiac's advertising and marketing approach was heavily based on performance. With GM's ban on factory-sponsored racing, Pontiac's managers began to emphasize street performance.

In his autobiography Glory Days, Pontiac chief marketing manager Jim Wangers, who worked for the division's contract advertising and public relations agency, states that John DeLorean, Bill Collins, and Russ Gee were responsible for the GTO's creation. It involved transforming the upcoming second-generation Pontiac Tempest (which reverted to a conventional front-engine with front transmission configuration) into a sporty car, with a larger  Pontiac V8 engine from the full-sized Pontiac Grand Prix hardtop coupe in place of the standard  V8. By promoting the big-engine option as a special high-performance model, they could appeal to the youth market (which had also been recognized by Ford Motor Company's Lee Iacocca, who was at that time preparing the Ford Mustang variant of the second generation Ford Falcon compact).

The development team discovered a loophole in the policy which did not restrict the offering of large engines as an option. Pontiac general manager Elliot "Pete" Estes approved the new model with sales manager Frank Bridge limiting initial production to 5,000 cars.

FIA Homologation 
The name, GTO, was DeLorean's idea, inspired by the iconic Ferrari 250 GTO. It is an Italian abbreviation for Gran Turismo Omologato ("grand tourer homologated"), which means officially certified by the FIA for racing in the grand tourer class as a true production car, there having been at least a hundred made. 

Unusually for such a Detroit marketing ploy, a conscientious Pontiac employee actually had the car homologated by the FIA in 1964, so that it was indeed possible for the GTO to compete in European sports car racing.

First generation

1964
The first Pontiac GTO began production September 3, 1963, and was available as an option package for the Pontiac LeMans, available in coupé, hardtop, and convertible body styles. Some limited power features were available, as well as other accessories.

Most contemporary road tests by the automotive press such as Car Life criticized the slow steering, particularly without power steering, and inadequate drum brakes, which were identical to those of the normal Tempest. Frank Bridge's initial sales forecast of 5,000 units proved inaccurate: the GTO package's total sales amounted to 32,450 units.

1965

The Tempest model line up, including the GTO, was restyled for the 1965 model year, adding  to the overall length while retaining the same wheelbase and interior dimensions. It had Pontiac's characteristic vertically stacked quad headlights. The brake lining area increased by nearly 15%. Heavy-duty shocks were standard, as was a stronger front antisway bar. The dashboard design was changed, and an optional rally gauge cluster (US$86.08) added a more legible tachometer and oil pressure gauge. An additional option was a breakerless transistor ignition.

The 389 cubic inches engines received revised cylinder heads with re-cored intake passages and high rise intake manifolds, improving airflow to the engine. Transmission and axle ratio choices remained the same. The three-speed manual was standard, while two four-speed manual transmissions (wide or close ratio) and a two-speed automatic transmission were optional.

The restyled car had a new simulated hood scoop. A seldom seen dealer-installed option consisted of a metal underhood pan and gaskets to open the scoop, making it a cold air intake. The scoop was low enough that its effectiveness was questionable (it was unlikely to pick up anything but boundary layer air), but it allowed an enhanced engine sound. Another exterior change was the black "egg-crate" grille.

Car Life tested a 1965 GTO with Tri-Power and what they considered the most desirable options (close-ratio four-speed manual transmission, power steering, metallic brakes, rally wheels, 4.11 limited-slip differential, and "Rally" gauge cluster), with a total sticker price of US$3,643.79. With two testers and equipment aboard, they recorded a 0–60 miles per hour (0–97 km/h) acceleration time of 5.8 seconds, the standing quarter-mile in 14.5 seconds with a trap speed of 100 miles per hour (160 km/h), and an observed top speed of 114 miles per hour (182.4 km/h) at the engine's 6,000 rpm redline. A four-barrel Motor Trend test car, a heavier convertible handicapped by the two-speed automatic transmission and the lack of a limited-slip differential, ran 0–60 mph in 7 seconds and through the quarter-mile in 16.1 seconds at 89 miles per hour (142.4 km/h).

Major criticisms of the GTO continued to center on its slow steering (ratio of 17.5:1, four turns lock-to-lock) and subpar brakes. Car Life was satisfied with the metallic brakes on its GTO, but Motor Trend and Road Test found the four-wheel drum brakes with organic linings to be alarmingly inadequate in high-speed driving.

Sales of the GTO, abetted by a marketing and promotional campaign that included songs and various merchandise, more than doubled to 75,342. It spawned many imitators, both within other GM divisions and its competitors.

1966

The GTO became a separate Pontiac model (model number 242) in 1966, instead of being an "option package" on the Tempest LeMans. The entire GM "A" body intermediate line was restyled that year, gaining more curvaceous styling with kicked-up rear fender lines for a "Coke-bottle" look, and a slightly "tunneled" backlight. The tail light featured a louvered cover, only seen on the GTO. Rear track increased one inch (2.5 cm). Overall weight remained about the same. The GTO was available as a pillared coupe, a hardtop (without B-pillars), and a convertible. An automotive industry first was a plastic front grille that replaced the pot metal and aluminum versions used in earlier years. New Strato bucket seats were introduced with higher and thinner seat backs and contoured cushions for added comfort and adjustable headrests were introduced as a new option. The instrument panel was redesigned and more integrated than in previous years with the ignition switch moved from the far left of the dash to the right of the steering wheel. Four pod instruments continued, and the GTO's dash was highlighted by walnut veneer trim.

Engine and carburetor choices remained the same as the previous year, except the Tri-Power option was discontinued mid-model year. A new engine was offered that saw few takers: the XS option consisted of a factory Ram Air set up with a new 744 high lift cam. Approximately 35 factory-installed Ram Air packages are believed to have been built, though 300 dealership-installed Ram Air packages are estimated to have been ordered.

Sales increased to 96,946, the highest production figure for all GTO years. Although Pontiac had strenuously promoted the GTO in advertising as the "GTO Tiger," it had become known in the youth market as the "goat."

1967

The GTO underwent a few styling changes in 1967. The louver-covered taillights were replaced with eight tail lights, four on each side. Rally II wheels with colored lug nuts were also available in 1967. The GTO emblems located on the rear part of the fenders were moved to the chrome rocker panels. The grille was changed from a purely split grille to one that shared some chrome.

The 1967 GTO was available in three body styles:
Hardtop – 65,176 produced
Convertible – 9,517 produced
Sports coupe – 7,029 produced

The GTO also saw several mechanical changes in 1967. The Tri-Power carburetion system was replaced with a single 4-barrel Rochester Quadrajet carburetor. The  engine received a larger cylinder bore  for a total displacement of  V8, which was available in three models: economy, standard, and high output. Emission controls were fitted in GTOs sold in California.

The 1967 model year required new safety equipment. A new energy-absorbing steering column was accompanied by an energy-absorbing steering wheel, padded instrument panel, non-protruding control knobs, and four-way emergency flashers. A shoulder belt option was also featured, and the brake master cylinder was now a dual reservoir unit with a backup hydraulic circuit.

The two-speed automatic transmission was also replaced with a three-speed Turbo-Hydramatic TH-400, which was equipped with a Hurst Performance dual-gate shifter, called a "his/hers" shifter, that permitted either automatic shifting in "drive" or manual selection through the gears. Front disc brakes were also an option in 1967.

The GTO sales for 1967 totaled 81,722 units.

Second generation

1968

General Motors redesigned its A-body line for 1968, with more curvaceous, semi-fastback styling, which was a revival of a streamlining on all GM products from 1942 until 1950 as demonstrated on the Pontiac Streamliner. Pontiac abandoned the familiar vertically stacked headlights in favor of a horizontal layout, but made hidden headlights available at extra cost. The concealed headlights were a popular option. The signature hood scoop was replaced by dual scoops on either side of a prominent hood bulge extending rearward from the protruding nose.

A unique feature was the body-color Endura front bumper. It was designed to absorb impact without permanent deformation at low speeds. Pontiac touted this feature heavily in advertising, showing hammering at the bumper to no discernible effect. A GTO could be ordered with "Endura delete", in which case the Endura bumper would be replaced by a chrome front bumper and grille from the Pontiac LeMans.

At mid-year, a new Ram Air package, known as Ram Air II, became available. It included freer-breathing cylinder heads, round port exhaust, and the 041 cam. The 'official' power rating was not changed. Another carry-over from 1967 was the four-piston caliper disc brake option. However, most 1968 models had drum brakes all around. The 1968 model year was also the last year the GTOs offered separate crank-operated front door vents.

Concealed windshield wipers, which presented a cleaner appearance hidden below the rear edge of the hood, were standard on the GTO and other 1968 GM products after having been originally introduced on 1967 full-size Pontiacs. A popular option, actually introduced during the 1967 model year, was a hood-mounted tachometer, located in front of the windshield and lit for visibility at night. An in-dash tachometer was also available.

Redline bias-ply tires continued as standard equipment on the 1968 GTO, though they could be replaced by whitewall tires at no extra cost. A new option was radial tires for improved ride and handling. However, very few were delivered with the radial tires because of manufacturing problems encountered by the supplier B.F. Goodrich. The radial tire option was discontinued after 1968. Pontiac did not offer radial tires as a factory option on the GTO again until the 1974 model.

Testers were split about handling, with Hot Rod calling it "the best-balanced car [Pontiac] ever built," but Car Life chided its excessive nose heaviness, understeer, and inadequate damping.

Royal Pontiac, located in Royal Oak, Michigan, offered a 428/Royal Bobcat conversion of the 1968 GTO. For $650.00 a 390-horsepower 428 cubic inch engine was installed in place of the 400. The 428 CI engine was disassembled and blueprinted to produce more than the advertised factory 390 horsepower and capable of 5,700 rpm. Car and Driver road-tested the 428 CI powered car with the Turbo-Hydramatic transmission and 3.55 gears. It could do 0–60 MPH in 5.2 seconds, 0–100 in 12.9 seconds, and the 1/4 mile in 13.8 seconds at 104 mph. This compared to a  Car Life road test of a 400 CI powered GTO with a Ram Air engine, four-speed transmission, and 3.90 gear which did 0–60 in 6.6 seconds, 0–100 in 14.6 seconds, and the 1/4 mile in 14.53 at 99.7 mph. Car and Driver wrote that the 428 CI powered car was "a fine, exciting car for either touring or tooting around in traffic. Not overly fussy. Not difficult to drive–-up to a point. Too much throttle at the wrong time will spin the car, or send it rocketing off the road and into the farmer's field. You can light up the car's tires like it was an AA-fueler anytime the notion seizes your fancy." On the other hand, according to Car Life, the Ram Air powered car "likes to run between 3,000 and 6,000 rpm. Below 3,000, the GTO ran flat and a bit rough. Part-throttle driving at 2,000 rpm around town was difficult and unpleasant. Freeway cruising at 4,000 rpm is anything but pleasant and promises short life for hard-working engine components. Also, driving the GTO on wet roads with this deep geared axle was thrilling. Rear tire breakaway could be provoked by a slight jab at the accelerator, sending the car into a minor skid that usually used up more than one lane of space."

Like all 1968 passenger vehicles sold in the United States, GTOs now featured front outboard shoulder belts (cars built after January 1, 1968) and side marker lights. To comply with the new 1968 federal vehicle emissions standards, the GTO was now equipped with emissions controls.

Now facing competition both within GM and from Ford, Dodge, and Plymouth—particularly the low-cost Plymouth Road Runner—the GTO won the Motor Trend Car of the Year Award. Sales reached 87,684 units, which would ultimately prove to be the second-best sales year for the GTO.

1969

The 1969 model eliminated the front door vent windows, had a slight grille and taillight revision, moved the ignition key from the dashboard to the steering column (which locked the steering wheel when the key was removed, a federal requirement installed one year ahead of schedule), and the gauge face was changed from steel blue to black. In addition, the rear quarter-panel mounted side marker lamps changed from a red lens shaped like the Pontiac "arrowhead" emblem to one shaped like the broad GTO badge. Front outboard headrests were made standard equipment on all cars built for 1969.

Unlike the highest rpm Chevy big-block and Hemi engines, the Ram Air IV utilized hydraulic lifters.

By this time, the gross power ratings of both Ram Air engines were highly suspect, bearing less relationship to developed power and more to an internal GM policy limiting all cars except the Corvette to no more than one advertised horsepower per  of curb weight. The higher-revving Ram Air IV's advertised power peak was actually listed at 5,000 rpm—100 rpm lower than the less-powerful Ram Air 400.

A new model called "The Judge" was introduced. The name came from a comedy routine, "Here Come de Judge", used repeatedly on the Rowan & Martin's Laugh-In TV show. The Judge routine, made popular by comedian Flip Wilson, was borrowed from the act of long-time burlesque entertainer Dewey "Pigmeat" Markham. Advertisements used slogans like "All rise for the Judge" and "The Judge can be bought". As originally conceived, the Judge was to be a low-cost GTO, stripped of features to make it competitive with the Plymouth Road Runner. The package was US$332 more expensive than a standard GTO, and included the Ram Air 400 engine, Rally II wheels without trim rings, Hurst shifter (with a unique T-shaped handle), wider tires, various decals, and a rear spoiler. Pontiac claimed that the spoiler had some functional effect at higher speeds, producing a small but measurable downforce, but it was of little value at legal speeds. The Judge was initially offered only in Carousel Red, but midway into the model year, other colors became available.

The GTO was surpassed in sales both by the Chevrolet Chevelle SS396 and the Plymouth Road Runner, but 72,287 were sold during the 1969 model year, with 6,833 of them having the Judge package.

1970

The Tempest model line received another facelift for the 1970 model year. Hidden headlights were deleted in favor of four exposed round headlamps outboard of narrower grille openings. The nose retained the protruding vertical prow theme, although it was less prominent. While the standard Tempest and LeMans had chrome grilles, the GTO retained the Endura urethane cover around the headlamps and grille.

The suspension was upgraded with the addition of a rear anti-roll bar, essentially the same bar as used on the Oldsmobile 442 and Buick Gran Sport. The front anti-roll bar was slightly stiffer. The result was a useful reduction in body lean in turns and a modest reduction of understeer.

Another handling-related improvement was optional variable-ratio power steering. Rather than a fixed ratio of 17.5:1, requiring four turns lock-to-lock, the new system varied its ratio from 14.6:1 to 18.9:1, needing 3.5 turns lock-to-lock. Turning diameter was reduced from 40.9 feet (12.5 m) to 37.4 feet (11.4 m).

The base engine was unchanged for 1970, but the low-compression economy engine was deleted and the "400 Ram Air"(aka "Ram Air III"), now simply called "Ram Air", and Ram Air IV remained available.

A new option was Pontiac's D-port 455 HO engine (different from the round-port offerings of the 1971–72 cars), available now that GM had rescinded its earlier ban on intermediates with engines larger than 400 cubic inches. The 455, a long-stroke engine also available in the full-size Pontiac line as well as the Grand Prix, was dubiously rated by Pontiac at  360 hp, only moderately stronger than the base 350 hp 400 CID and less powerful than the  "Ram Air". The camshafts used in the "Ram Air" 400 and the GTO 455 HO were the same. For example, the manual transmission 455 HO's used the same 288/302 duration cam as the "Ram Air" 400. Its advantage was torque:  at 2,700 rpm. A functional Ram Air scoop was available but when so equipped official horsepower and torque ratings were unchanged. Both were about  slower than a "Ram Air" GTO with four-speed, although considerably less temperamental: the Ram Air engine idled roughly and was difficult to drive at low speeds.

A new and short-lived option for 1970 was the Vacuum Operated Exhaust (VOE), which was vacuum actuated via an under-dash lever marked "exhaust". The VOE was designed to reduce exhaust backpressure and to increase power and performance, but it also substantially increased exhaust noise. The VOE option was offered from November 1969 to January 1970. Pontiac management was ordered to cancel the VOE option by GM's upper management following a TV commercial for the GTO that aired during Super Bowl IV on CBS January 11, 1970. In that commercial, titled the "Humbler"(an advertising tagline Pontiac used in print ads to describe all 1970 GTOs), which was broadcast only that one time, a young man pulled up in a new GTO to a drive-in restaurant with dramatic music and exhaust noise in the background, pulling the "exhaust" knob to activate the VOE and then left the drive-in after failing to find a street racing opponent. That particular commercial was also canceled by order of GM management. Approximately 233 1970 GTOs were factory built with this option including 212 hardtop coupes and 21 convertibles, equipped with either four-speed manual or Turbo Hydra-Matic transmissions. While allegedly all were equipped with the standard GTO "YS" 400ci 350 hp V-8 engine, according to the 1970 Pontiac Accessorizer book, VOE was available with the 455 V-8.  The Accessorizer book does say that VOE was not available with either 400 cubic inch engines with Ram Air, though it does not specify whether it was unavailable with the 455 when equipped with the optional Ram Air induction components.  The particular GTO in the commercial was Palladium Silver with a black bucket seat interior. It was unusual in several respects as it also had the under-dash "Ram Air" knob just to the right of the VOE knob, and it sported "'69 Judge" stripes, as a few very-early '70 GTOs could be ordered with. It also had a Ram Air IV 400 V-8 engine, 4-speed manual transmission, remote mirror, Rally II wheels, A/C, hood tachometer, and a new-for-1970 Formula steering wheel.  The particular car in the ad was a 1970 GTO pilot car built in May of 1969.

The Judge package remained available as an option on the GTO. The Judge came standard with the "Ram Air" 400 V-8, while the Ram Air IV was optional. Though the 455 HO V8 was available as an option on the standard GTO throughout the entire model year, the 455 HO was not offered on the Judge until late in the year. Orbit Orange (actually a bright school bus yellow hue) became the new feature color for the 1970 Judge, but any GTO color was available. Arch striping was relocated to above the creases above the wheel wells, a new styling trait of the 1970 GTO introduced the previous year on the 1969 Firebird.  The Judge package also included dark argent grille surrounds, black painted hood air inlet ornaments, and a revised, higher rear airfoil. 

The new styling did little to help declining sales, which were now being hit by sagging buyer interest in all muscle cars, fueled by the punitive surcharges levied by automobile insurance companies, which sometimes resulted in insurance payments higher than car payments for some drivers. Sales were down to 40,149, of which 3,797 were the Judge. Of those 3,797 cars built in the Judge trim level, only 168 were ordered in the convertible form: RA 400 (147 built), RA IV (18 built), and 455 HO (3 built). The '69/'70 "round-port" RA IV engine, a derivative of the '68½ "round-port" RA II engine, was the most exotic high-performance engine ever offered by PMD and factory-installed in a GTO or Firebird. The 1969 version had a slight advantage as the compression ratio was still at 10.75:1 as opposed to 10.5:1 in 1970. A total of 37 RA IV GTO convertibles were built-in 1970: 24 four-speeds and 13 automatics. Of the 13 1970 GTO RA IV/auto convertibles built only six received the Judge option. The GTO remained the third best-selling intermediate muscle car, outsold only by the Chevrolet Chevelle SS 396/454 and the Plymouth Road Runner.

1971

The 1971 GTO had another modest facelift, this time with wire-mesh grilles, horizontal bumper bars on either side of the grille opening, more closely spaced headlamps, and a new hood with the dual scoops relocated to the leading edge, not far above the grille. Sport mirrors increased standard width by two inches, from 74.5 to 76.5 inches.

A new corporate edict, aimed at preparing GM for no-lead gasoline, forced an across-the-board reduction in compression ratios. The "Ram Air" and Ram Air IV  engines did not return for 1971. The standard GTO engine was still the 400 CID V8, but now with 8.2:1 compression ratio. It had  SAE net at 4,400 rpm in the GTO and  SAE net at 4,400 rpm in the Firebird.

An engine option was the 455 CID V8 with four-barrel carburetor, 8.4:1 compression ratio and 325 hp (242 kW) at 4,400 rpm, which was only available with the Turbo Hydra-matic TH-400 transmission. It had  SAE net at 4,000 rpm in the GTO and  SAE net in the Firebird. This engine was not available with Ram Air induction.

It had  SAE net at 4,400 rpm in the GTO and  SAE net in the Firebird Trans Am or Formula 455 with Ram Air induction(Formula; shaker hood inlet on Trans Am). The 1971 Pontiac brochure declared that this engine produced more NET horsepower than any other engine in its history. That would imply the 400 CID V8 Ram Air engines had less than 310 hp net.

For 1971, the standard rear-end was an open 10 bolt. Positraction 10 bolt rear ends were available as an option on 400 CI engine-equipped GTO's, while all 455 CI GTO's were available with a 12 bolt open or optional 12 bolt Positraction rear-end.

Motor Trend tested a 1971 GTO with the 455, four-speed transmission, and 3.90 axle, and obtained a 0–60 mph acceleration time of 6.1 seconds and a quarter mile acceleration time of 13.4 seconds at 102 mph (164 km/h).

The Judge returned for a final year, With the standard equipment being the Mountain Performance package was the 455 HO. Only 357 were sold, including 17 convertibles. On February 11, 1971 Pontiac announced that no new orders for The Judge would be accepted after March 1, 1971. Only 10,532 GTOs were sold in 1971, 661 of which were non-Judge equipped convertibles.

1972

In 1972, the GTO reverted from a separate model to a US$353.88 option package for the LeMans and LeMans Sport coupes. On the base LeMans line, the GTO package could be had with either the low-priced pillared coupé or hardtop coupé. Both models came standard with cloth and vinyl or all-vinyl bench seats and rubber floor mats on the pillared coupe and carpeting on the hardtop, creating a lower-priced GTO. The LeMans Sport, offered only as a hardtop coupe, came with Strato bucket seats upholstered in vinyl, along with carpeting on the floor and lower door panels, vinyl door-pull straps, custom pedal trim, and cushioned steering wheel, much like GTOs of previous years. Other optional equipment was similar to 1971 and earlier models. Planned for 1972 as a GTO option was the ducktail rear spoiler from the Pontiac Firebird, but after a few cars were built with that option, the mold used to produce the spoiler broke, and it was canceled. Rally II and honeycomb wheels were optional on all GTOs, with the honeycomb wheels now featuring red Pontiac arrowhead emblems on the center caps, while the Rally II wheels continued with the same caps as before, with the letters "PMD" (for Pontiac Motor Division).

The optional 455 had the same rated power (although at a peak of 3,600 rpm), but substantially more torque. Most of the drop was attributable to the new rating system (which now reflected an engine in as-installed condition with mufflers, accessories, and standard intake). The engines were relatively little changed from 1971.

Optional was the 455 HO engine, essentially similar to that used in the Trans Am. Despite its modest 8.4:1 compression, it was as strong as many earlier engines with higher gross power ratings; yet like all other 1972-model engines, it could perform on low-octane regular leaded, low-lead, or unleaded types of gasoline. Only 646 cars with this engine were sold.

Sales plummeted by 45%, to 5,811. (Some sources discount the single convertible and the three anomalous wagons, listing the total as 5,807.) Although Pontiac did not offer a production GTO convertible in 1972, a buyer could order a LeMans Sport convertible with either of the three GTO engines and other sporty/performance options to create a GTO in all but name. Even the GTO's Endura bumper was offered as an option on LeMans/Sport models, with "PONTIAC" spelled out on the driver's side grille rather than "GTO."

Third generation

1973

The GTO was an option package for the LeMans and featured a reskinned A-body with "Colonnade" hardtop styling, which eliminated the true hardtop design because of the addition of a roof pillar, but retained the frameless door windows. Rear side windows were now of a fixed design that could not be opened and in a triangular shape. New federal laws for 1973 demanded front bumpers capable of withstanding 5-mile-per-hour (8 km/h) impacts with no damage to the body (5 mph rear bumpers became standard in 1974). The result was the use of prominent and heavy chrome bumpers at the front and rear. The overall styling of the 1973 Pontiac A-body intermediates (LeMans, Luxury LeMans, GTO, and Grand Am) was generally not well received by the general public.

In contrast, the Pontiac Grand Prix and Chevrolet Monte Carlo, which were also derived from the intermediate A-body, were much better received because of their squared-off styling and formal rooflines with vertical windows. Pontiac's sister division, Oldsmobile, received better reviews from the automotive press and the car-buying public with the similar-bodied Cutlass.

Again, the 1973 GTO option was offered on two models including the base LeMans coupe or the LeMans Sport Coupe. The base LeMans coupe featured a cloth-and-vinyl or all-vinyl bench seat while the more lavish LeMans Sport Coupe had all-vinyl interiors with Strato bucket seats or a notchback bench seat with a folding armrest. The LeMans Sport Coupe also had louvered rear side windows from the Grand Am in place of the standard triangular windows of the base LeMans.

The standard 400 CID V8 in the 1973 GTO was further reduced in compression to 8.0:1, dropping it to 230 hp (170 kW). The 400 engine was available with any of the three transmissions including the standard three-speed manual, or optional four-speed or Turbo Hydra-Matic. The 455 CID V8 remained optional but was dropped to 250 hp (186 kW) and available only with the Turbo Hydra-Matic transmission. The 455 HO engine did not reappear, but GM initially announced the availability of a Super Duty 455 engine (shared with the contemporary Pontiac Trans Am SD455), and several such cars were made available for testing, impressing reviewers with their power and flexibility. Nevertheless, the Super Duty was never actually offered for public sale in the GTO. Eight prototypes were built for testing but were subsequently destroyed.

A new change for 1973 was a hood accented with NACA ducts. These ducts were designed to force air into the ram air-induction system. Although such a system was never offered on the production GTO.

Sales dropped to 4,806, due in part to competition from the new Grand Am and the lack of promotion for the GTO. By the end of the model year, an emerging oil crisis quashed consumer interest in muscle cars.

Fourth generation

1974
Wanting to avoid internal competition with the "Euro-styled" Pontiac Grand Am, and looking for an entry into the compact muscle market populated by the Plymouth Duster 360, Ford Maverick Grabber, and AMC Hornet X, Pontiac moved the 1974 GTO option to the compact Pontiac Ventura, which shared its basic body shell and sheetmetal with the Chevrolet Nova.

The GTO option was available in both the base Ventura and the Ventura Custom lines. It was offered as a two-door coupe version featuring a traditional separate trunk or a two-door hatchback with an opening integrated rear backlight and deck with hydraulic struts to allow access to a cargo area and included a fold-down rear seatback. The two body styles differed in profile and also had distinct rear quarter glass designs.

The base Ventura interior consisted of bench seats and rubber floor mats, Bucket seats could be added for $132 (Code A51), while the Ventura Custom had upgraded bench seats or the optional Strato bucket seats along with carpeting, cushioned steering wheel, and custom pedal trim.

The $461 GTO package (Code WW3) included a three-speed manual transmission with Hurst floor shifter, heavy-duty suspension with front and rear anti-roll bars, a shaker hood, special grille, wing mirrors, and wheels, and various GTO emblems. The only engine was the  V8 with a 7.6:1 compression ratio and a Rochester 4MC Quadrajet carburetor. Optional transmissions included a wide-ratio four-speed with Hurst shifter for $207 (Code M20) or the three-speed Turbo Hydra-Matic. Power Steering was a $104 option (Code N41) as well as Power front disc brakes for $71 (Code JL2).

Bias-belted tires were standard equipment, but a radial tuned suspension option added radial tires along with the upgraded suspension.

The revamped model quickly became a sore spot for loyalists, a situation not helped when Motor Trend tested the "Hot Sports Compacts" in their February 1974 issue—the staff could only muster a 0–60 mph acceleration time of 9.5 seconds and a quarter-mile trap time of 16.5 seconds (at 84.03 mph). Jerry Heasley of High Performance Pontiac magazine called the car "a joke of a Ventura compact...uglier and stupid looking," in their August 1983 Special GTO issue.

Sales improved over the 1973 model year to 7,058 units, but not enough to justify continuing marketing the GTO option package. Problems for the 1974 model year included an oil embargo and gas rationing. Other factors leading to the discontinuation of the GTO were the declining interest in performance cars and tighter emissions requirements that lowered engine compression ratios to use unleaded fuel and catalytic converters.

1999 concept car
During the 1999 Detroit Auto Show, a GTO concept car with a heritage-inspired "Coke-bottle" shape, grille, and hood scoop, was introduced to the world. It was only intended to be a design study and had no engine. It had styling cues paying homage to all the generations of the Pontiac GTOs such as rear quarter windows reminiscent of the 1967 Pontiac GTO, hood-mounted tachometer pod, split grilles, tapered tail lights, twin hood scoops, and unique 21-inch wheels.

Fifth generation

2004
In 2004, the Pontiac GTO was relaunched in the U.S. market in the form of a rebadged, third-generation Holden Monaro.

The VZ Monaro-based GTO was Pontiac's first captive import since the 1988–1993 Pontiac LeMans. The V2/VZ Monaro was a 2-door coupe variant of the Australian developed VT/VX Holden Commodore. The Monaro was also exported to the United Kingdom as the Vauxhall Monaro and to the Middle East as the Chevrolet Lumina SS.

The revival was prompted by former GM North America Chairman Bob Lutz, who had the idea of importing a Holden Commodore-based vehicle after reading a Car and Driver review of the Holden Commodore SS, published circa 2000. Car and Driver praised the performance of the V8 powered, rear-wheel drive Holden Commodore SS, but noted that even though it was one of the best vehicles that GM offered at the time, it could not be purchased in the United States. The idea of importing a rear-wheel drive Holden as a GM North American performance offering gradually transformed into importing the Monaro. Lutz, as well as other GM executives, later drove a Holden Monaro while on a business trip in Australia, which convinced them that importing the car could be a profitable venture.

Lutz had to convince GM executive hierarchy to import the car and overcome a corporate culture that promoted regional autonomy between GM North America and its overseas divisions. This resulted in an "unnecessarily long gestation period," as Lutz put it, and at a much higher cost than anticipated. The Monaro design was introduced in 2001 but appeared "dated" in 2003 when it was released in the United States. It was also originally planned to sell for about $25,000, but by the time it was launched in the U.S., the Australian dollar's growth against the U.S. dollar had inflated the price of the car to well over $34,000. Both of these elements played a role in the car's lukewarm acceptance by the general public.

The GTO was assembled by GM's Holden subsidiary at Elizabeth, South Australia. It was equipped with the 5.7 L LS1 V8 engine for the 2004 model year, the same engine found in the concurrent model year Chevrolet Corvette, with a choice of a 6-speed manual transmission or a 4-speed automatic. Changes from the Australian-built Monaro included bracing additions to the body to meet U.S. crash standards, a "corporate Pontiac" front facia, new badging, "GTO" stitching on the front seats and a revised exhaust system. GM Engineers benchmarked the sound of the 1964 GTO held in the Pontiac historical collection, as well as other LS1-powered vehicles while working with the exhaust vendor to tune the system. The effort was made to make the new GTO invoke the same sound as the original while still meeting the noise threshold required by some states. The 2004 GTO exhaust was a true dual system that followed the original Monaro exhaust routing, thus both tailpipes exited on the driver side of the vehicle. General Motors claimed performance of 0–60 mph in 5.3 seconds and a 13.8 second quarter mile time, which was closely verified by several automotive magazine tests.

Initially, in 2004, the car was offered in seven colors: Barbados Blue Metallic, Cosmos Purple Metallic, Quicksilver Metallic, Phantom Black Metallic, Impulse Blue Metallic, Torrid Red, and Yellow Jacket.

GM had high expectations to sell 18,000 units, but the lukewarm reception of the car in the U.S. curtailed the target. The styling was frequently derided by critics as being too "conservative" and "anonymous" to befit either the GTO heritage or the current car's performance. Given the newly revived muscle car climate, it was also overshadowed by the Chevrolet Monte Carlo, Chrysler 300, Dodge Charger, Dodge Magnum, and the new Ford Mustang, all of whom featured more traditional "muscle car" aesthetics. Critics also pointed out the car's high sale price. Sales were also limited because of tactics of dealerships, such as initially charging large markups and denying requests for test drives of the vehicle. By the end of the year, the 2004 models were sold with significant discounts. Sales totaled 13,569 of the 15,728 imported cars for 2004.

The hood scoops that originally were slated for production in 2005 were pushed into production as part of an over-the-counter Sport Appearance Package. The 2004 Sport Appearance Package also included a taller and more angular rear spoiler, as well as deeper inset front grilles.

Closing out the 2004 model year was the W40 package featuring an exclusive paint color called Pulse Red, red “GTO” embroidery on black-anthracite seats, and a grey-colored gauge cluster. The last 794 units of the 2004 model year GTOs were equipped with the W40 package.

Performance
Pontiac GTO 5.7 (2004)
 Top Speed - 160 mph
 0-60 mph - 5.0 seconds
 0-100 mph - 12.3 seconds
 Quarter Mile Drive - 13.9 seconds

2005

The 2005 model year continued with the standard hood scoops, split rear exhaust pipes with a revised rear fascia, and late in the year, optional 18 inch (45.7 cm) wheels. The major change for 2005 was the replacement of the LS1 engine with the LS2 engine. Other changes included larger front rotors and caliper hardware from the Corvette, a strengthened drivetrain with the addition of a driveshaft with larger "giubos" and a larger differential flange, as well as revised half-shafts. Dashboard gauge graphics were revised. The optional dealer-installed Sport Appearance Package became available and differed visually by having a different lower rear fascia, aftermarket mufflers with quad chrome exhaust tips, revised spoiler, and front lower fascia extension, recessed grilles and revised rocker panels. This package was available from GM as an accessory in red, silver, black, or primer for other color cars. Production amounted to 11,069 cars due in part to a shortened model year. Barbados Blue and Cosmos Purple were dropped for the year, but Cyclone Grey and Midnight Blue Metallic were added. Customers also had the option to order their GTO without hood scoops (RPO code BZJ), though only 24 cars were produced with such an option. The 0–100 mph and 0–130 mph times were 11.7 and 19.6 respectively. Motor-week also tested the 2005 GTO.

2006

For 2006, two additional colors were added, Spice Red Metallic and Brazen Orange Metallic, while Midnight Blue Metallic and Yellow Jacket were dropped. Changes for 2006 included revised blacked-out tail lamps, illuminated steering wheel radio controls, faster moving power seat motors, and an interior power door lock switch.

On February 21, 2006, Buick-Pontiac-GMC General Manager John Larson announced to dealers that GM would halt imports of the GTO in September, making 2006 the last model year for the new GTO. The explanation was the inability to meet new airbag deployment standards for 2007. The final production numbers of the 2006 Pontiac GTO amounted to 13,948 cars, an increase from 11,069 cars from the previous model year.

The last Pontiac GTO, which was also the last Monaro-based coupe produced, came off the assembly line in Australia on June 14, 2006. Total production for all three years amounted to 40,808 vehicles. The fifth generation of the GTO was only intended as a limited production car for those 3 years from the beginning of the program.

Performance
Pontiac GTO 6.0 (2005-06)
 Top Speed - 180 mph
 0-60 mph - 4.8 seconds
 0-100 mph - 11.2 seconds
 Quarter Mile Drive - 13.1 seconds

Motorsports
David Pearson drove a 1971 GTO in the Winston Cup Series.

Production numbers
Production numbers for the Pontiac GTO from 1964 to 1970.

References

External links

 GTOAA.ORG GTO Association of America
 
 

Muscle cars
GTO
Rear-wheel-drive vehicles
Convertibles
Coupés
Station wagons
1970s cars
Pontiac GTO (2004 onwards)
2000s cars
Cars introduced in 1964
Motor vehicles manufactured in the United States